Russell Norman Adam (born May 5, 1961) is a Canadian former professional ice hockey player who played eight games in the National Hockey League for the Toronto Maple Leafs. Russ is the father of current hockey player Luke Adam.

Playing career 
Born in Windsor, Ontario, Adam was drafted in the seventh round, 137th overall, by the Toronto Maple Leafs in the 1980 NHL Entry Draft. He played a total of eight games in the NHL, all for the Leafs. He managed 1 goal, 3 points, and 11 penalty minutes in the 1982–83 season. Adam ended his playing days in St. John's, Newfoundland and Labrador in the Newfoundland Senior Hockey League. He resides in St. John's to this day with his wife Paula. Russ's son Luke was drafted 44th overall by the Buffalo Sabres in the 2008 NHL Entry Draft in Ottawa.

Career statistics

Regular season and playoffs

References 
 

1961 births
Living people
Canadian expatriate ice hockey players in the United States
Canadian ice hockey centres
Fort Wayne Komets players
Ice hockey people from Ontario
Kitchener Rangers players
New Brunswick Hawks players
Sportspeople from Windsor, Ontario
St. Catharines Saints players
Toronto Maple Leafs draft picks
Toronto Maple Leafs players
Windsor Spitfires players